Sonerila janakiana is a species of plant in the  family Melastomataceae. It is a tuberous, scapigerous and stoloniferous plant species.

Etymology 
The species is named to honor Janaki Ammal Edathil Kakkat, an Indian botanist.

References

Melastomataceae